Westhouses Locomotive Depot was a traction maintenance depot located in Westhouses, Derbyshire, England. 

The depot's TOPS code was WT.

History 
From March 1966 to November 1966, Class 11 locomotives were stabled here but they were sent to Newton Heath and Crewe Diesel TMD. Class 20, 25, 47 and 56 locomotives were also stabled here. After a Class 56 derailed in the shed yard, a decision was taken to close the lines into the shed and the staff were moved to Tibshelf Sidings where locomotives continued to service mid week.

References 

 Railway depots in England